This page lists the World Best Year Performance in the year 2007 in both the men's and the women's hammer throw. The main event during this season were the 2007 World Athletics Championships in Osaka, Japan, where the final of the men's competition was held on August 27, 2007. The women had their final three days later, on August 30, 2007.

Men

Records

2007 World Year Ranking

Women

Records

2007 World Year Ranking

References
tilastopaja
IAAF
apulanta

2007
Hammer Throw Year Ranking, 2007